Victor Watts,  (18 April 1938 – 21 December 2002) was a British toponymist, medievalist, translator, and academic, specialising in English place names. He served as Master of Grey College, Durham from 1989 until his sudden death in 2002. He had been a lecturer in English at Durham University from 1962, honorary director of the English Place-Name Survey from 1993, and editor of the Journal of the English Place-Name Society from 1996.

Early life and education
Watts was born on 18 April 1938. He was educated at Bristol Grammar School, then an all-boys private school in Bristol. He studied at Merton College, Oxford, and at the University of London.

Academic career

In 1962, Watts jointed Durham University as a lecturer in English language. He was promoted to senior lecturer in 1974. His first association with Grey College, Durham was as a pastoral tutor. Then, from 1984 to 1989, he served as the college's senior tutor and vice-master. In 1989, he was appointed Master of Grey College. He was, by his death, one of the longest serving head of college at Durham University. He additionally served as Dean of Colleges, leading the university's 15 colleges, between 1999 and 2002.

Outside of his university, he held a number of positions. He was an active member of the Architectural and Archaeological Society of Durham and Northumberland: he served successively as vice-president and then president of the society between 1983 and 1991. In 1993, he was appointed honorary director of the English Place-Name Survey, and therefore of the English Place-Name Society, in succession to Kenneth Cameron. He served as general editor of the society's survey volumes from 1994, and was also editor of the Journal of the English Place-Name Society from 1996.

Personal life
Watts had three children with his first wife, Mary Watts: two daughters and a son. Having divorced Mary, he later married Elaine; this marriage brought two stepsons.

Watts died on 21 December 2002, aged 64. He had had a heart attack.

Honours
Watts had been elected a Fellow of the Royal Historical Society (FRHistS), and a Fellow of the Society of Antiquaries of London (FSA).

Selected works

References

 

 
 
 

1938 births
2002 deaths
Toponymists
British medievalists
Masters of Grey College, Durham
Academics of Durham University
People educated at Bristol Grammar School
Alumni of Merton College, Oxford
Alumni of the University of London
Fellows of the Royal Historical Society
Fellows of the Society of Antiquaries of London
20th-century British translators